Andreas Rüedi (20 June 1931 – 22 February 2008) was a Swiss alpine skier. He competed in the men's downhill at the 1956 Winter Olympics. In 1957, he founded an architecture company based in Klosters, Switzerland. It is now led by his son, Andreas Rüedi jr.

References

External links
 

1931 births
2008 deaths
Swiss male alpine skiers
Olympic alpine skiers of Switzerland
Alpine skiers at the 1956 Winter Olympics
Place of birth missing